The Carnegie Library in El Reno, Oklahoma is the oldest Carnegie library in Oklahoma that is still functioning as a library. Constructed in 1903, it was listed on the National Register of Historic Places in 1980 and has been in continuous use as a library since its opening.

The main feature of the Classical Revival structure is its two-story portico with four ionic columns. The only structural addition to the library since its construction was a fireproof archives room built in 1964.

References

Carnegie libraries in Oklahoma
Library buildings completed in 1903
Libraries on the National Register of Historic Places in Oklahoma
Buildings and structures in Canadian County, Oklahoma
Neoclassical architecture in Oklahoma
National Register of Historic Places in Canadian County, Oklahoma